Rafael Polanco Cruz (June 24, 1913 – death date unknown)  was a Puerto Rican baseball left fielder in the Negro leagues. He played with the Newark Eagles in 1941. Some sources list him playing for the Philadelphia Stars in 1942.

References

External links
 and Seamheads

Newark Eagles players
1913 births
Year of death missing
Puerto Rican baseball players
Baseball outfielders
Sportspeople from San Juan, Puerto Rico